Olympic Airways - Services S.A. is the largest aircraft ground handling operator in Greece.

History
Olympic Airways - Services, was formed in 2003 as a solution to the growing Olympic Airways problem. In 1994, the European Commission ordered the Greek government to finally restructure the ailing Olympic Airways Group of Companies.

In December 2003, the government decided to split the Olympic Airways Group into two different companies. The first, renamed, Olympic Airlines, took over the Group's flight operations, starting with no debts. All Olympic Airways debts and other operations were transferred to the new company, Olympic Airways - Services S.A.. Today, the company specializes in 7 sectors of the airline industry (including ground handling at 38 Greek airports, cargo, aircraft maintenance, training center and flightacademy, Olympic Aviation helicopter charters and the information technology unit). Olympic Aviation became a wholly owned subsidiary of the company.

O.A. - Services also provides VIP lounge services for Olympic Airline and other airlines, such as Luxair, in most Greek airports.

The company announced its 2006 budget, showing very little profit, after many decades of rising losses and debts. The company (and the former Olympic Airways Group) has never shown any profit since it was sold to the Greek state in 1975 by its founder, Aristotle Onassis. Profit was only once announced, in 1996.

External links
 Olympic Airways - Services
 Olympic Airlines
 Olympic Aviation

Olympic Airlines